Cecil Clifford Pritchard  (1 May 1902 - 27 August 1966) was an international rugby union hooker who represented Wales on eight occasions and was best associated at club level with Pontypool RFC.

Personal history
Pritchard was born in the Tranch are of Pontypool, Wales in 1902. He was the second of three brothers who would all go on to have rugby careers. Pritchard work as a collier before later working for the local council. He died in Newport, Wales in 1966.

Rugby career
Pritchard first played rugby for local team, Tranch Rovers, same as his elder brother George 'Cogley' and younger brother Royce. George played local rugby for Blaenavon RFC before moving to the south west of England where he played for Barnstaple RFC and Torquay Athletic RFC.

International matches played
Wales
  1928, 1929
  1928, 1929
  1928, 1929
  1928, 1929

Bibliography

References 

1902 births
1966 deaths
Barbarian F.C. players
Cross Keys RFC players
Pontypool RFC players
Rugby union hookers
Rugby union players from Pontypool
Wales international rugby union players
Welsh rugby union players